Broadhalfpenny Down (pronounced /ˌbrɔ:dˈheɪpniː/; brawd-HAYP-nee) is a historic cricket ground in Hambledon, Hampshire. It is known as the "Cradle of Cricket" because it was the home venue in the 18th century of the Hambledon Club, but cricket predated the club and ground by at least two centuries. The club is in the parish of Hambledon close to the neighbouring parish of Clanfield. The club took the name of the neighbouring rural village of Hambledon, about 2.7 miles away by road.

The ground lies on a ridge connecting Broadhalfpenny Down itself with higher ground to the north at Wether Down and Salt Hill. The ridge and the down to the south are crossed by the Monarch's Way long-distance footpath before it descends towards Horndean.

Hambledon era
The cricket ground was the home venue for matches organised by the Hambledon Club from 1753 to 1781 which generally involved a Hampshire county team. It was used for other sports including horse racing and hare coursing. Immediately next to the ground is the Bat & Ball Inn, known as the "cradle of cricket" whose landlord for ten years from 1762 to 1772 was Hambledon captain Richard Nyren. Nyren was succeeded by his Hambledon colleague William Barber, who ran the pub from 1772 to 1784.

The name "Broadhalfpenny" is properly pronounced "broad ha'penny" a contraction following the usual pronunciation of the word for the halfpenny coin. Places that had obtained a charter from the King to hold markets or establish fairs were issued with Letters Patent stamped with "Broad-Halfpenny". Hambledon in the eighteenth century was a large parish of over 9,000 acres containing small hamlets and detached farms in addition to the main village. Much of the agricultural land had been enclosed in small farms but there remained extensive commons, including Broadhalfpenny, on which grazing rights existed.

As an important match venue, the earliest known use of Broadhalfpenny Down was in August 1753 for a match between a Hambledon team and one from Surrey. Three years later, the Hambledon team was able to challenge Dartford, then one of the strongest teams in England, in a series of three matches. On Wednesday, 18 August, one of these matches was played at Broadhalfpenny Down. The source for this is an advertisement placed in the Reading Mercury newspaper by the Reverend Richard Keats of Chalton for information about his dog, a spaniel called Rover, whom he lost at the match. Reverend Keats was the father of Admiral Sir Richard Goodwin Keats who is renowned for his actions at the Battle of Algeciras Bay in July 1801. Chalton is three and a half miles east of Broadhalfpenny Down, beyond Clanfield.Match reports were scarce in the 1750s but were becoming more common in the 1760s and it is known that Hampshire defeated Kent at Broadhalfpenny in 1768, their outstanding batsman John Small scoring more than 140 runs in the match. Scores were higher then than in earlier times and matches were tending to go into a second day. In 1770, a Sussex lawyer called John Baker left an account in his diary of a match between Hambledon and the Surrey club Coulsdon which lasted two days. Baker came from Chichester, a journey of twenty miles taking four hours on horseback. He wrote how he went to Petersfield for overnight accommodation. Baker wrote about the very large crowds which gathered at these matches and the good business done by vendors on site.

The 1772 season is notable in English cricket history because it is from then that surviving scorecards are common and three exist of 1772 matches organised by the Hambledon Club which commence a continuous statistical record.

Those three matches were all between a Hampshire XI and an England XI, the first played at Broadhalfpenny on 24 and 25 June. The two leading online archives begin their first-class coverage with this match which is numbered "first-class no.1" by ESPNcricinfo and "f1" by CricketArchive.

On 13 July 1775, Small scored 136 not out and Nyren 98 for Hampshire against Surrey at Broadhalfpenny and Small's innings is the earliest known century in first-class cricket. Despite being ordained, a Steward of the Hambledon Club and a member of the Laws of Cricket committee, the Reverend Charles Powlett was not above gambling on the outcome of matches or of betting against his own team. At one point in the match against Surrey, the situation was such that a Surrey victory seemed certain. Powlett and his associate Philip Dehaney, another Hambledon member, decided to bet heavily on Surrey to win. Then Small was joined at the wicket by his captain Nyren and the two put on a massive century partnership which turned the game around, for Surrey collapsed and Hampshire won a famous victory.

When Nyren was out, he was confronted by Powlett and Dehaney who complained that he and Small had cost them their money. Nyren, disgusted with them, retorted: "Another time, don't bet your money against such men as we are."

Broadhalfpenny Down continued in regular use by Hambledon/Hampshire teams until 1781. At the end of that season, the Hambledon Club moved to Windmill Down, which is closer to the village. According to John Nyren, Windmill was "one of the finest places for playing on I ever saw". A key difference was that Windmill was under the club's control as they rented it from a farmer at ten guineas a year, whereas Broadhalfpenny was common land in use as sheep pasture, for fairs and other gatherings.
It could be said that Broadhalfpenny belonged to the community and Windmill to the club, whose members may not have been happy about the "raucous, boisterous crowds that gathered (on the Down)". The move was done at the behest of the Duke of Dorset, chief among club members, and David Underdown saw it as the first step in a process which removed professional cricket from a truly rural setting and ultimately concentrated it in an urban environment, for it was Dorset's successors George Finch, 9th Earl of Winchilsea and Colonel Charles Lennox who were the key players in the establishment of the White Conduit Club in Islington and subsequently Marylebone Cricket Club at Lord's.

Later years

The ground fell into disuse through most of the nineteenth century and was converted to agriculture. Attempts were made to restore the ground with the result that a Hambledon v England XI fixture in 1908 appears in the generally accepted list of first-class fixtures. This was intended as a commemorative match and featured famous players C. B. Fry and Phil Mead. Hampshire cricketer Edward Whalley-Tooker, who played in the 1908 match, was a descendant of a member of the original Hambledon Club. Following the match in 1908 the ground was reclaimed for farming. Whalley-Tooker set about the task of securing its permanent use for cricket and in 1925 it was restored to host cricket matches. The possession of the land was given to Winchester College, with the college and Hambledon playing the first match there since its restoration. Whalley-Tooker led the Hambledon side to victory.

In 1939 local side Portsmouth FC had just won the FA Cup, defeating Wolverhampton Wanderers 4–1, so the engineering company that leased the ground, Wadhams, organised a celebratory cricket match against Westgate Brewery. Former England captain Plum Warner played and told the crowd "I should take off my shoes and socks," he told the crowd, "because I’m treading on holy ground…".  A few months later, Germany invaded Poland and the FA Cup itself was moved for safekeeping to a pub in Lovedean, not far from Broadhalfpenny Down, for the duration of the war. Portsmouth would hold the Cup until a final was played again April 1946.In 2000, David Underdown visited the ground while researching his history Start of Play. He wrote that "across the road from the famous Bat and Ball pub [was] a clunky monument and a green field with a cricket pavilion, sightscreens, and a square that bore the scars of recent matches." A notice by the pavilion announced that it was the home ground of the Broadhalfpenny Buccaneers.  In this latter assertion Underdown is slightly mistaken in that the club he refers to is the Broadhalfpenny Brigands Cricket Club, formed in 1959 by a group of officers in the Royal Navy serving at nearby HMS Mercury (now closed). This club has used Broadhalfpenny Down as its home ground continuously since then. The history of Broadhalfpenny Down in the 20th century is covered in Ashley Mote's book "The Glory Days of Cricket", which explores the full history of the ground effectively up to the present day (apart from the addition of a new pavilion in 1999 nothing substantial has changed since the first publication of Mote's book in 1997).

Today Hambledon Cricket Club use Broadhalfpenny Down for their 3rd XI fixtures playing in the Hampshire Cricket League and ground is also used by Hampshire Visually Impaired Cricket Club and the juniors within the Hampshire County Cricket Club Regional Performance Centre.

The Broadhalfpenny Brigands play Wednesday and Sunday friendly cricket, mostly in a "time" format. Chairman Gerry Northwood described the philosophy of Brigands cricket as "holding fast to the Corinthian spirit whilst we pursue a competitive and close-fought game, one in which we seek for all players, Brigand and opposition, the opportunity to shine. A game in which the trajectory is to the wire and a final over nail-biter."

in 2022, the M.C.C. featured Broadhalfpenny Down and the 250th anniversary of first-class cricket on the back of its membership pass and sent a team down to play against a Broadhalfpenny Down XI on a scorching hot August afternoon with the MCC triumphant. Fullers, the landlords of the adjacent Bat and Ball pub brewed a special "1772" IPA beer to mark the anniversary.

Articles were published by Elgan Alderman, Ivo Tennant, Jon Hotten and Guy Ladenburg covering the 250th anniversary.

On Friday 24 June 2022 a Hampshire All Star XI led by Mark Nicholas and Georgia Adams played an All England XI that included Chris Tremlett and Charlotte Edwards  as well as well-known actors, cricket writers and players from the England Disability Cricket team. Hampshire All Stars won, on the last ball, by 3 runs. Former England captain, Charlotte Edwards said: "Broadhalfpenny Down is steeped in cricketing history and this year's anniversary is a significant one. I'm thrilled to be involved and excited to mark such a special occasion in the history of the game we all love. Hambledon is a beautiful setting in which to play and watch and I am looking forward to the celebrations of the historic match and famed ground continuing throughout the year." The match was captured in oil by famous cricketing painter Jack Russell.

In December 2022, Broadhalfpenny Down was voted the "best view in Hampshire" in a poll of 24 cricket grounds.

New Year's Day Matches

Broadhalfpenny Down hosted a match on New Year's Day 2022 to kick off a season of celebrating two and half centuries of First-Class cricket. It's only the third time that the ground has seen play on New Year's Day.

In 1929 a charity cricket match was played between the Hampshire Eskimos and The Invalids Cricket Club, a club founded in 1919 for players wounded in WW1. Ex-Sergeant Major Newland, fondly known as Picolo Jim, climbed on top of the monument and beckoned the players to the field to start the match. The game, which was interrupted by the Hampshire Hunt, was a cold and low scoring affair with The Invalids scoring 89 all out and the Eskimos scoring 78 in reply. It was so bitter and cold that as soon as the last wicket fell the players went straight to the Bat and Ball and drank the pub dry.

At the turn of the millennium Hambledon CC arranged a match commencing at the stroke of midnight using car headlights to light the ground, play was then halted due to bad light and resumed later in the day. An Adi Aymes Benefit Invitation XI beat a Hambledon team by 2 wickets knocking off the 61 required for victory.

In 2022 the Hampshire Huskies, comprising local cricketers and journalists, beat the Broadhalfpenny Brigands by 17 runs. Huskies lost the toss (using a George III Halfpenny from 1772) and batted first playing in blue bobble hats; Brigands played in green but warm headwear was unnecessary as it was the warmest New Year's Day on record. The game was played 20 overs a side with a pink ball on an artificial pitch, in stark contrast to games that would have been played 250 years earlier. After the match players and supporters retired to the Bat and Ball pub for a traditional roast dinner and post match refreshment.

Broadhalfpenny Down Preservation Trust
The Broadhalfpenny Down Preservation Trust was incorporated in 2010 and granted charitable status in 2012. It is responsible for raising the funds to fulfil the following objectives:

1. For the benefit of the public to protect, preserve, maintain and improve the historic cricket ground at Broadhalfpenny Down as a feature of special historical interest and its facilities.

2.To promote community participation in healthy recreation by providing the cricket ground for the training and playing of cricket for the benefit of (amongst others) young people including those with learning difficulties and disabilities and those who might otherwise have limited access to recreational facilities.

3. To promote the education of the public on matters connected with the history of the cricket ground and thus the history of cricket itself.

Patrons of the Trust include Dr Ali Bacher, JRT Barclay DL, David Gower OBE, Lord Maclaurin of Knebworth DL, The Rt Hon Sir John Major KG CH, Mark Nicholas, The Hon Sir Oliver Popplewell, Sir Tim Rice, Barry Richards, Sir Garfield Sobers, Richard Stilgoe OBE DL, Raman Subba Row CBE, John Woodcock OBE

References

Bibliography

Further reading

External links
  A history of the ground and an up to date list of fixtures and events

1753 establishments in England
Buildings and structures in Hampshire
Cricket grounds in Hampshire
Cricket in Hampshire
English cricket venues in the 18th century
Hampshire
Hills of Hampshire
History of Hampshire
Sport in Hampshire
Sports venues completed in 1753
Sports venues in Hampshire